Ogorzelec  is a village in the administrative district of Gmina Kamienna Góra, within Kamienna Góra County, Lower Silesian Voivodeship, in south-western Poland. Prior to 1945 it was in Germany.

In the years 1975-1998 the village was a region of Jelenia Góra.

Gallery

References

Villages in Kamienna Góra County